The BMW M52 is a straight-6 DOHC petrol engine which was produced from 1994 to 2000. It was released in the E36 320i, to replace the M50. The BMW S52 engine is a high performance variant of the M52 which powered the American and Canadian market E36 M3 from 1996 to 1999.

In 1998, the "technical update" (M52TU) upgrades included adding variable valve timing to the exhaust camshaft.

The M52 was replaced by the M54 in the year 2000. The M52 and S52 engines were on the Ward's 10 Best Engines list from 1997 to 2000.

Design 
In most markets, the M52 switched from the M50's cast iron engine block to a lightweight aluminium engine block. However, most M52 engines produced for the United States and Canadian markets (except for those used by the BMW Z3 roadster) retained the M50's cast iron engine block, while other cars used the new aluminum M52 block with iron sleeves.

The largest version of the M52 is 2.8 litres, compared with 2.5 litres for the M50. As per the later versions of the M50, the M52 uses variable valve timing on the intake camshaft (called "single-VANOS"). The redline remained at 6,500 rpm.

Technical Update versions 
In 1998, the M52TU ("Technical Update") was released, adding variable valve timing to the exhaust camshaft (called "double VANOS"). Other upgrades included a new design throttle body with the ASC (traction control) motor built in and throttle cable override, revised coolant passages with an additional drain back passage and a new cooling system with push fit hoses and a separate expansion tank plus  a dual length intake manifold (called "DISA") and steel cylinder liners (in the aluminum block) carried over from the previous M52, these replacing Nikasil in March 1998.

Models

M52B20
A  version was introduced in 1994. The compression ratio is 11.0:1.

Applications:
 1994-1998 E36 320i
 1995-1998 E39 520i

M52TUB20
The "technical update" in 1998 included double VANOS, which improved low rpm torque.

Applications:
 1998-2000 E46 320i, 320Ci
 1998-2000 E39 520i
 1999-2000 E36/7 Z3 2.0i

M52TUB24
2.4 L. For Thai market only.

M52B25
A  version introduced in 1995. It produces . The compression ratio is 10.5:1.

Applications:
 1995-1998 E36 323i
 1995-2000 E36/5 323ti
 1995-1998 E39 523i

M52TUB25
The "technical update" in 1998 included double VANOS, which improved low rpm torque.

Applications:
 1998-2000 E46 323i, 323Ci
 1998-2000 E39 523i
 1998-2000 E36/7 Z3 2.3i

M52B28
The  version of the M52 debuted in 1995. The compression ratio is 10.2:1.

Applications:
 1995-1999 E36 328i, 328is
 1995-1998 E39 528i
 1995-1998 E38 728i, 728iL
 1997-1998 E36/7 Z3 2.8
 1997-2000 Land Rover Defender (South Africa only)

M52TUB28
The "technical update" in 1998 included double VANOS, which improved low rpm torque.

Applications:
 1998-2000 E46 328i, 328Ci
 1998-2000 E36/7/8 Z3 2.8
 1998-2000 E39 528i
 1998-2000 E38 728i

Nikasil problems with high sulfur fuels
The aluminum M52 engine received criticism in some markets with high levels of sulfur in the petrol during the late 1990s. Sulfur has a corrosive effect on Nikasil and led to many early M52 and M60 engines having premature bore-liner wear. Countries with high sulfur fuel (such as the United States) received an iron block version of the M52 (except for the M52B28 in the Z3 which was an aluminium block), so the Nikasil problem does not apply to most M52 engines in these countries.

Once the Nikasil coating was determined to be the cause of the problem, steel cylinder liners were used instead of the Nikasil coating. Therefore, the M52TU engine was not affected by the Nikasil problem.

S52  

The S52 is a higher performance version of the M52, which replaced the S50B30US in the post-facelift (1996-1999) North American E36 M3.

Compared to the European-spec S50, the S52 is less powerful. The S52 also shares more in common with the regular M52 engine than the S50 did with the M50, for example sharing the engine block (cast iron, as per North American M52 engines) and cylinder head. Compression ratio is 10.5:1. Other upgrades over the M52 include lighter camshafts (with increased lift and duration), valve springs and the exhaust system.

The S52 has a redline of 7,000 rpm while the M52 has a 6,500 rpm redline.

Applications:	
 1996-1999 E36 M3 (Canada and United States only)	
 1998-2000 E36/7/8 Z3M (Canada and United States only)

See also
 BMW engines
 BMW M50
 BMW M54

References

M52
Straight-six engines
Gasoline engines by model